Erik Nikkinen (born 10 February 1944) is a Finnish boxer. He competed in the men's lightweight event at the 1968 Summer Olympics. At the 1968 Summer Olympics, he lost to Calistrat Cuțov of Romania.

References

1944 births
Living people
Finnish male boxers
Olympic boxers of Finland
Boxers at the 1968 Summer Olympics
Sportspeople from Oulu
Lightweight boxers